t Pallieterke is a satirical Flemish weekly magazine. It is part of the Flemish movement and advocates Flemish independence. It is largely conservative in its editing.

History and profile
The magazine has its headquarters in Antwerp and is published on a weekly basis.

In 1955 De Winter was succeeded by Jan Nuyts as editor-in-chief, whose tenure lasted till 2000. The current editor-in-chief is Leo Custers. Its cartoonists have included Jef Nys and Brasser.  Other contributors are or were Gerolf Annemans, Paul Beliën and Koenraad Elst.

See also
 List of magazines in Belgium

References

External links
  

1945 establishments in Belgium
Magazines published in Belgium
Satirical magazines published in Belgium
Magazines published in Flanders
Magazines established in 1945
Mass media in Antwerp
Weekly magazines published in Belgium